Gmina Głubczyce is an urban-rural gmina (administrative district) in Głubczyce County, Opole Voivodeship, in south-western Poland.

Geography
Gmina Głubczyce is located in the Głubczyce Hook partly on the Głubczyce Plateau (a part of the Silesian Lowlands) and partly in the Opawskie Mountains (a part of the Eastern Sudeten). Gmina Głubczyce is located in the Oder River Basin (rivers: Cyna/Psina, Opawa, Opawica,  Stradunia, Troja).

Neighbouring gminas
Gmina Głubczyce is bordered by the gminas of Baborów, Branice, Głogówek, Kietrz and Pawłowiczki and by the Czech obeces of Krnov, Město Albrechtice, Slezské Rudoltice, Rusín, Bohušov and Osoblaha.

Twin towns – sister cities

Gmina Głubczyce is twinned with:

 Krnov, Czech Republic (2001)
 Město Albrechtice, Czech Republic (2001)
 Rockenhausen, Germany (2003)
 Rusín, Czech Republic (2000)
 Saint-Rémy-sur-Avre, France (2002)
 Zbarazh, Ukraine (2005)

Gallery

See also
Dobrogostów
Głubczyce-Las
Klisinko
Marysieńka, Opole Voivodeship

References

Glubczyce
Głubczyce County